Odabakht was a 3rd-century Sasanian prince. He was the son of Shapur Mishanshah, a Sasanian prince who governed Maishan, and was the son of the Sassanian shah Shapur I. Odabakht's mother was a certain queen named Denag. Odabakht had many other siblings named Hormizdag, Hormizd, Bahram, Shapur, Peroz, and Shapurdukhtak. In 260, his father died and was probably succeeded by Denag as the governor of Maishan.

Odabakht probably later died before the ascension of his uncle Narseh in 293.

Sources
 
 

3rd-century Iranian people
Sasanian princes
3rd-century deaths
3rd-century births